The Skudiburgh Formation is a geological formation in Scotland and the uppermost unit of the Great Estuarine Group, it is late Bathonian in age. The lithology largely consists of red and grey-green silty mudstone with lenticular siltstone and sandstone beds.

References

Geology of Scotland
Stratigraphy of the United Kingdom
Bathonian Stage